Cosmopolites is a genus of true weevil in the Dryophthorinae subfamily and tribe Sphenophorini.  The type species and most economically important is the banana weevil Cosmopolites sordidus.

Species
The genus contains at least five described species, including the following:
 Cosmopolites sordidus (Germar, 1824) Marshall, G.A.K., 1930, banana weevil, banana stemborer
 Cosmopolites cribricollis Csiki, E., 1936
 Cosmopolites mendicus Csiki, E., 1936
 Cosmopolites pruinosus Heller, K.M., 1934
 Cosmopolites striatus Fairmaire, L., 1902

References

Dryophthorinae